This article contains information about the literary events and publications of 1768.

Events
March – John Wilkes, returning from exile in France, is elected to the Parliament of Great Britain.
May 10 – John Wilkes is imprisoned for attacking King George III of Great Britain in print.
July 28 – Thomas Gray succeeds Lawrence Brockett as Regis Professor of History at the University of Cambridge.
December 12 – Walter Butler, 16th Earl of Ormonde, father of Lady Eleanor Butler, inherits Kilkenny Castle in Ireland. This brings about the first meeting of the Ladies of Llangollen.
unknown dates
John Murray (publisher) is established in London.
The Theatre Royal, Bath (Old Orchard Street Theatre) and Theatre Royal, Norwich assume these titles on being granted Royal Patents, making them officially England's only legal provincial theaters.
The Leeds Library is founded, becoming the oldest surviving subscription library of its type in Britain.

New books

Fiction
John Cleland – The Woman of Honour (attributed)
Alexander Dow (translated) – Tales Translated from the Persian of Inatulla of Delhi
Voltaire – La Princesse de Babylone
José Francisco de Isla – Historia del famoso predicador fray Gerundio de Campazas, alias Zotes (second part)
Anonymous – Fumoto no iro

Children
Christopher Smart – Parables of Our Lord and Saviour Jesus Christ (verse)

Drama
Isaac Bickerstaffe
Lionel and Clarissa
The Hypocrite
The Padlock
Alexander Dow – Zingis
Samuel Foote – The Devil on Two Sticks
Oliver Goldsmith – The Good-Natur'd Man
John Hoole – Cyrus
Hugh Kelly – False Delicacy
Arthur Murphy – Zenobia
Michel-Jean Sedaine – La gageure imprévue
Heinrich Wilhelm von Gerstenberg – Ugolino
Horace Walpole – The Mysterious Mother (published)
William Shakespeare, ed. Edward Capell – Mr. William Shakespeare His Comedies, Histories and Tragedies

Poetry

Isaac Hawking Browne – Poems
Thomas Gray – Poems
Richard Jago – Labour and Genius
Edward Jerningham – Amabella
Mary Wortley Montagu – Poetical Works
Henry James Pye – Elegies
Alexander Ross – The Fortunate Shepherdess
Christopher Smart – The Parables of Our Lord and Saviour Jesus Christ
William Wilkie – Fables

Non-fiction
Abraham Booth – The Reign of Grace
James Boswell – An Account of Corsica
William Gilpin – An Essay upon Prints, containing remarks upon the principles of picturesque beauty
Oliver Goldsmith – The Present State of the British Empire in Europe, America, Africa, and Asia
Richard Gough – Anecdotes of British Topography
Joseph Priestley – An Essay on the First Principles of Government
Tobias Smollett – The Present State of all Nations
Laurence Sterne – A Sentimental Journey through France and Italy
Gilbert Stuart – An Historical Dissertation Concerning the Antiquity of the English Constitution
Emanuel Swedenborg – Deliciae Sapientiae de Amore Conjugiali
Abraham Tucker (as Edward Search) – The Light of Nature Pursued
Horace Walpole – Historic Doubts on the Life and Reign of King Richard III
Arthur Young – A Six Weeks' Tour Through the Southern Counties of England and Wales

Births
March 22 – Melesina Trench, Irish-born writer and socialite (died 1827)
September 4 – François-René de Chateaubriand, French writer and diplomat (died 1848
November 18 – Zacharias Werner, German religious poet (died 1823)
November 21 – Friedrich Schleiermacher, German theologian (died 1834)

Deaths
March 1 – Hermann Samuel Reimarus, German philosopher (born 1694)
March 18 – Laurence Sterne, Irish-born novelist and cleric (born 1713)
April 9 – Sarah Fielding, English novelist and children's author (born 1710)
May 30 – Eggert Ólafsson, Icelandic writer and linguist (drowned, born 1726)
July 4 – Willem van Haren, Dutch poet (born 1710)
August 20 – Joseph Spence, English memoirist and professor of poetry (born 1699)
November 25 – Alexander Russell, Scottish physician and naturalist (born c. 1715)
December 20 – Carlo Innocenzio Maria Frugoni, Italian poet (born 1692)

References

 
Years of the 18th century in literature